The River Laneshaw is a river in Northern England.

Rising as Laneshaw Brook on Combe Hill between the border of Lancashire and Yorkshire, the brook runs northwards, feeding first Laneshaw Reservoir then running westwards as the River Laneshaw.

The River Laneshaw combines with Wycoller Beck at Covey Bridge to form Colne Water.

References

Laneshaw
Laneshaw
Laneshaw
3Laneshaw